Excoecaria acuminata is a species of flowering plant in the family Euphorbiaceae. It was described in 1932. It is native to Fiji.

References

acuminata
Plants described in 1932
Flora of Fiji